The Erie and New York City Railroad was a railroad that operated in New York.

Among the earliest supporters of the New York and Erie Railroad were prominent Jamestown residents who lobbied for the railroad to go through their town. Unfortunately for Jamestown, after much debate, the route chosen by the railroad bypassed Jamestown by 35 miles in favor of Salamanca, Dayton and Dunkirk.

After being snubbed by the New York and Erie, townspeople met on June 27, 1851, in Jamestown and on June 30, 1851, a petition for a charter for the Erie and New York City Railroad was published. The road was to be built from West Salamanca, through Randolph and Jamestown, to the Pennsylvania state line. Work began on the line began in Randolph on May 19, 1853, and was abandoned on January 5, 1855, for lack of funds.

On May 7, 1859, the Atlantic and Great Western Railroad in New York was chartered with William Reynolds as its president. One of the first actions of the A&GW was to purchase the Erie and New York City Railroad in 1860. According to the "First Annual Report of The Atlantic & Great Western Railway", the A&GW assumed $14,000 of 7 percent bonds upon the purchase of the Erie and New York City and received 3 locomotives, 2 passenger cars, and 40 freight cars from the contractors building the Erie and New York City.

External links
Western New York Railroad Archive

References

Adams, William (editor). 1893. Historical Gazetteer and Biographical Memorial of Cattaraugus County, N.Y. Syracuse, NY: Lyman, Horton & Co., Limited.
Atlantic & Great Western Railway. 1863. First Annual Report of the Atlantic & Great Western Railway. Buffalo, NY: Wheeler, Mathews & Warren, Com'l Adv. Printing House.
Mott, Edward. 1899. Between the Ocean and the Lakes - The Story of Erie. New York, NY: J.S. Collins.

Defunct New York (state) railroads
Predecessors of the Erie Railroad
Railway companies established in 1851
Railway companies disestablished in 1860
1851 establishments in New York (state)
American companies disestablished in 1860
1860 disestablishments in New York (state)
American companies established in 1851